The Witcher 3: Wild Hunt – Blood and Wine is the second and final expansion pack for the 2015 video game The Witcher 3: Wild Hunt. Developed by CD Projekt Red, Blood and Wine was released for Windows, PlayStation 4, and Xbox One on 31 May 2016, and later released for the Nintendo Switch on 15 October 2019, with PlayStation 5 and Xbox Series X/S versions released on 14 December 2022. The expansion follows Geralt of Rivia as he travels to Toussaint, a duchy untouched by the war taking place in the base game, as he hopes to track down a mysterious beast terrorizing the region. The expansion received widespread acclaim from critics, winning a number of awards. Many consider it to be one of the best downloadable content packs ever made.

Plot 
Set after the events of the base game, Geralt is offered a contract by Duchess Anna Henrietta, the ruler of Toussaint, a vassal duchy under the Nilfgaardian Empire. Two knights of Toussaint have been murdered in strange circumstances, and Geralt is tasked with finding and killing the monster responsible.

When Geralt arrives in Toussaint, a third knight dies. All the men seem to be killed for violating the five virtues that all knights of Toussaint swear to uphold. He later sees a fourth knight get killed by the Beast, a higher vampire. He battles him until Regis, another higher vampire and friend of Geralt, interrupts the fight and convinces the Beast to leave. Regis explains that the Beast is named Dettlaff. Regis is bonded to Dettlaff, by whom he is recovered, by vampire code.

Geralt and Regis find out that someone kidnapped Dettlaff's former lover Rhenawedd to force him to murder the knights. After investigating for a while, they meet a wine keeper, who admits to selling to a mysterious buyer, known as the Cintrian. The Cintrian later gets killed while trying to steal a jewel that Henrietta identifies as a family heirloom lost many years ago. She speculates that her long lost sister Syanna, who was exiled for supposedly being afflicted by a curse, may be involved.

Geralt, Regis and Detlaff team-up to investigate and discover that Syanna and Rhenawedd are the same person. She faked her own kidnapping and orchestrated the attempted theft of the jewel. Dettlaff feels betrayed and threatens to destroy the capital city of Toussaint, unless Syanna agrees to meet him for an explanation within three days. Henrietta demands Geralt to kill Dettlaff after learning he is the Beast.

Three days later, lesser vampires begin attacking the city. To find Detlaff, Geralt has two choices: free Syanna or find the Unseen Elder. If Geralt chooses to free Syanna, he goes to the Land of a Thousand Fables, a world within an enchanted fairy tale book where the sisters used to play as children, and locates her. While in there, he has the option to retrieve a magical ribbon for her. She explains that she killed the knights because they exiled her, and some of them even abused her. If Geralt opts to find the Unseen Elder, he persuades him to summon Dettlaff.

At this point, several endings are possible. If Geralt opts to release Syanna from the book's world, she, Geralt and Regis meet Dettlaff in Tesham Mutna. If Geralt retrieves the ribbon, then it saves Syanna from Dettlaff's killing blow. Then a fight starts, Regis reluctantly kills Dettlaff and Geralt is awarded Toussaint's highest honor. Before going to the ceremony, he can choose to uncover the identity of Syanna's would-be fifth victim, which turns out to be Henrietta. Geralt can then opt to confront Syanna in her cell about it. Regardless, he attends the ceremony where the duchess judges Syanna for her crimes. If he chooses not to look into the fifth victim, or if he investigates it and then talks to Syanna in an admonishing manner, she kills Henrietta and then de la Tour shoots her. With no living heirs to the dukedom, Toussaint falls into a state of chaos. If Geralt asks Syanna to consider forgiving her sister, which is only possible if he previously read a governess' diary, the two sisters resolve their differences, and Toussaint celebrates.

If Geralt did not retrieve Syanna's ribbon, Dettlaff confronts her and kills her. Geralt can choose to let him go or kill him with the help of Regis. Whichever his decision, he is thrown into prison for failing to save Syanna. Geralt's friend Dandelion convinced Henrietta to release him. Geralt then meets with Regis and can choose to look into the fifth victim. After finding out it is the duchess, he goes with Dandelion to the ducal crypt where she is grieving. She refuses to believe Geralt and forbids him from seeing her ever again.

If Geralt opts for the Unseen Elder path, the elder vampire forces Dettlaff to appear in Tesham Mutna. A fight starts and Dettlaff dies. Later at the ceremony, Syanna kills Anna and gets killed in turn.

Either way, if Dettlaff was killed, Regis is attacked by vampires who label him a traitor. Geralt returns home to the vineyard estate that formed part of his payment to find a surprise visitor. Depending on the choices and endings from the base game, the visitor may be either Yennefer or Triss (if Geralt romanced either of them in the base game), Ciri (if Geralt romances neither) or Dandelion (if Geralt romances neither and Ciri does not survive the base game).

Release 
On 7 April 2015, CD Projekt announced two expansion packs for The Witcher 3: Wild Hunt—the first expansion being Hearts of Stone and the second being Blood and Wine. Blood and Wine was released on 31 May 2016. It was later released alongside Hearts of Stone in a complete edition for the Nintendo Switch on 15 October 2019.

Reception 

Blood and Wine received "universal acclaim" from critics, according to review aggregator website, Metacritic. Many reviewers praised the way CD Projekt Red ended the storyline of the character Geralt of Rivia and the size of the expansion, with some saying it could be a new project. In a PC Gamer review by Tom Senior, he praised the developers for making such an in-depth expansion, and if they kept getting released, he'd still be playing The Witcher in 2020. Senior commended the farewell to the series. The Escapist writer Steven Bogos states it is overall a good expansion but it's not the adventurous "save the world" storyline like the previous Witcher titles. He added that the farewell to Geralt of Rivia will leave a smile on your face. Richard Cobbett for Rock, Paper, Shotgun claimed the game wasn't CD Projekt Red's best work. He said it had a good story but not as good as Hearts of Stone'''s. On the contrary to Cobbett's review, Chris Carter for Destructoid believed Blood and Wine was better than Hearts of Stone due to the latter feeling like a "polished, elongated quest". He said Blood and Wine was expansive enough that it could be considered a new project. "Blood and Wine is sometimes as thematically dark as its predecessors", Kevin VanOrd said in a GameSpot review, although when compared to other aspects of The Witcher 3, it is less grim. Leif Johnson for IGN had initial doubts due to the slow start but started to "love it" within the first few hours of gameplay. Shacknews'' writer Josh Hawkins noted they experienced a few problems and bugs in the expansion but there wasn't much he didn't like. He added onto this by saying it was, overall, a good addition to the series. Similar to Hawkins, Mike Williams for USgamer said it was a good expansion overall and the farewell to Geralt of Rivia was a success.

References

External links 
 

2016 video games
Action role-playing video games
Open-world video games
PlayStation 4 games
The Witcher (video game series)
Video games developed in Poland
Video game expansion packs
Windows games
Xbox One games
CD Projekt games
Video games scored by Marcin Przybyłowicz